So Together is the only studio album by American group Innosense. The album cover features cartoon versions of the group on a swing.

Track listing
On the official version:
 "Ride" – 3:14 (Jive, Pennachio, Wolf)
 "Say No More" – 3:07 (Andreas Romdhane, Josef Larossi)
 "Beep Beep" – 4:15 (Liz Winstanley)
 "So Together" – 3:58 (Guy Roche, Shelly Peiken)
 "This Is It" – 3:11 (Larossi, Romdhane)
 "Rain Rain" – 3:58 (Guy Roche, Shelly Peiken)
 "You Didn't Have to Hurt Me" – 4:04 (Diane Warren)
 "www.fan-ta-see" – 3:26 (Denise Rich, Jive, Gregory Allen Bieck)
 "A Hundred Oceans" – 4:08 (Diane Warren)
 "A Real Good Man" – 4:12 (Full Force, David Foster)
 "You Can't Touch Me Now" – 3:46 (Steven R Diamond, Arnthor Birgisson, Anders Bagge)
 "I Wish" – 4:12 (Ian Green, Nina Meryl Ossoff, Stephanie Salzman)

Personnel
Rob Bailey, Andreas "QUIZ" Romdhane, Esbjorn Ohrwall, Ingo Schroeder, John Goux, Tony Battaglia: Guitars
Derek Brin, Guy Roche, Jive Jones, Wolf: Keyboards and Programming
Sven Kaiser: Electric Piano
Dushyant Bhakta: Scratching

References

2000 debut albums
Innosense albums
RCA Records albums
Albums produced by Guy Roche
Albums produced by Full Force